This is a bibliography  of works about the 19th-century philosopher Søren Kierkegaard.

Literature 
 
 
 
 
 
 
 
  World Cat
 World Cat
 
 
 
 
 
 
 
 
 Gardiner, Patrick. (1988)  Kierkegaard. Oxford University Press. 
 
 
 
 
 
 
 
 
 
 
 
 Jothen, Peder (2014). Kierkegaard, Aesthetics, and Selfhood: The Art of Subjectivity. Farnham, Surrey: Ashgate Publishing. .
 
 
 
 
 
 
 
 
 
 
 
 
 
  (Examines the lives of St. Augustine, Blaise Pascal, William Blake, Søren Kierkegaard, Fyodor Dostoevsky, Leo Tolstoy, and Dietrich Bonhoeffer)

Collections

Kierkegaard research by Ashgate Publishing 
Directed by Jon Stewart, the Søren Kierkegaard Research Center Foundation, and the University of Copenhagen:

Sources 
Volume 1: Kierkegaard and the Bible, edited by Lee C. Barrett and John Stewart
 Tome I: The Old Testament (June 2010)
 Tome II: The New Testament (July 2010)
Volume 2: Kierkegaard and the Greek World, edited by John Stewart and Katalin Nun 
 Tome I: Socrates and Plato (January 2010)
 Tome II: Aristotle and Other Greek Authors (January 2010)
Volume 3: Kierkegaard and the Roman World, edited by John Stewart (May 2009)
Volume 4: Kierkegaard and the Patristic and Medieval Traditions, edited by John Stewart (June 2008)
Volume 5: Kierkegaard and the Renaissance and Modern Traditions, edited by John Stewart
 Tome I: Philosophy (July 2009)
 Tome II: Theology (July 2009)
 Tome III: Literature, Drama and Aesthetics (August 2009)
Volume 6: Kierkegaard and His German Contemporaries, edited by John Stewart
 Tome I: Philosophy (August 2007)
 Tome II: Theology (August 2007)
 Tome III: Literature and Aesthetics (June 2008)
Volume 7: Kierkegaard and His Danish Contemporaries, edited by John Stewart
 Tome I: Philosophy, Politics and Social Theory (November 2009)
 Tome II: Theology (December 2009)
 Tome III: Literature, Drama and Aesthetics (December 2009)

Reception 
Volume 8: Kierkegaard’s International Reception, edited by John Stewart
 Tome I: Northern and Western Europe (April 2009)
 Tome II: Southern, Central and Eastern Europe (March 2009)
 Tome III: The Near East, Asia, Australia, and the Americas (January 2009)
Volume 9: Kierkegaard’s Influence on Existentialism (May 2011)
Volume 10: Kierkegaard’s Influence on Theology, edited by John Stewart
 Tome I: German Protestant Theology (May 2012)
 Tome II: Anglophone and Scandinavian Protestant Theology (April 2012)
 Tome III: Catholic and Jewish Theology (June 2012)
Volume 11: Kierkegaard’s Influence on Philosophy, edited by John Stewart
 Tome I: German and Scandinavian Philosophy (February 2012)
 Tome II: Francophone Philosophy (July 2012)
 Tome III: Anglophone Philosophy (April 2012)
Volume 12: Kierkegaard’s Influence on Literature, Criticism and Art, edited by John Stewart
 Tome I: The Germanophone World (February 2013)
 Tome II: Denmark (October 2013)
 Tome III: Sweden and Norway (June 2013)
 Tome IV: The Anglophone World (April 2013)
 Tome V: The Romance Languages and Central and Eastern Europe (May 2013)
Volume 13: Kierkegaard’s Influence on the Social Sciences, edited by John Stewart (November 2011)
Volume 14: Kierkegaard’s Influence on Social-Political Thought, edited by John Stewart (December 2011)

Resources 
Volume 15: Kierkegaard's Concepts, edited by Steven M. Emmanuel, William McDonald and John Stewart
 Tome I: Absolute to Church (November 2013)
 Tome II: Classicism to Enthusiasm (March 2014)
 Tome III: Envy to Incognito (June 2014)
 Tome IV: Individual to Novel (November 2014)
 Tome V: Objectivity to Sacrifice (February 2015)
 Tome VI: Salvation to Writing (July 2015)
Volume 16: Kierkegaard's Literary Figures and Motifs, edited by John Stewart and Katalin Nun
 Tome I: Agamemnon to Guadalquivir (October 2014)
 Tome II: Gulliver to Zerlina (January 2015)
Volume 17: Kierkegaard's Pseudonyms, edited by John Stewart and Katalin Nun (May 2015)
Volume 18: Kierkegaard Secondary Literature, edited by John Stewart
 Tome I: Arabic, Bulgarian, Chinese, Czech, Danish, Dutch
 Tome II: English and Finnish
 Tome III: French and German
 Tome IV: Greek, Hebrew, Hungarian, Italian, Japanese, Korean, Norwegian
 Tome V: Polish, Portuguese, Romanian, Russian, Serbian, Slovak, Slovenian, Spanish, Swedish, Turkish
Volume 19: Kierkegaard Bibliography, edited by Peter Šajda and John Stewart
 Tome I: Northern and Western Europe
 Tome II: Southern, Central and Eastern Europe
 Tome III: The Near East and Asia
 Tome IV: Figures
Volume 20. The Auction Catalogue of Kierkegaard's Library, edited by Katalin Nun, Gerhard Schreiber and John Stewart (April 2015)
Volume 21. Cumulative Index, edited by Katalin Nun

 
Bibliographies of people
Contemporary philosophical literature